Karamak-e Bala (also Romanized as Karamāk-e Bālā; also known as Bālā Karamāk) is a village in Jirandeh Rural District, Amarlu District, Rudbar County, Gilan Province, Iran. At the 2006 census, its population was 36, in 7 families.

References 

Populated places in Rudbar County